Zimmer is a Germanic word meaning room and also a surname.

It may refer to:

People
 Zimmer (surname), people with the surname
 Zimmer massacre, the 1812 massacre of the Zimmer family in Ohio

Places
 3064 Zimmer, asteroid named after Louis Zimmer
 Zimmer tower, a tower in Lier, Belgium
 Zimmerberg, mountain and region in Zürich, Switzerland

Companies
 Zimmer Biomet, an American medical device company
 Zimmer Biomet Robotics, a Swiss robotics company
 Zimmer Radio, a broadcasting group in Joplin, Missouri

Music
 Zimmer 483, second studio album by the German rock band Tokio Hotel
 Zimmer mit Blick. the fifth studio album by German band Revolverheld
 The Zimmers, a British rock band
 Zimmers Hole, a Canadian death/speed metal band

Other uses
 Zimmer (automobile), an American neo-classic automaker
 Zimmer frame, UK term for a walking aid rolling frame
 Zimmer's conjecture

See also

 
 Zimerman
 Zimmerman (disambiguation)
 Zimmermann (disambiguation)